Anderson Crenshaw (1783–1847) was an American jurist in the U.S. state of Alabama.

Born in South Carolina on May 22, 1783, Crenshaw was the first graduate of the South Carolina College at Columbia, later renamed the University of South Carolina. He became active in politics and was elected to the South Carolina General Assembly in 1812.

Several years later in 1819 Crenshaw moved to Cahawba, the first state capital of Alabama. There, he was appointed a judge of the circuit court, serving from 1821–1838. He served as an associate judge of the state supreme court from 1832, and as chancellor of the southern division of the state's courts. He died in 1847.

Honors
In 1866 the Alabama state legislature named the newly created Crenshaw County in his honor.

1783 births
1847 deaths
People from South Carolina
University of South Carolina alumni
Members of the South Carolina General Assembly
People from Dallas County, Alabama
Justices of the Supreme Court of Alabama
 
19th-century American politicians
19th-century American judges